Don W. Cleveland (born 1950 in Waynesville, MO) is an American cancer biologist and neurobiologist.

Cleveland is currently the Department Chair of Cellular and Molecular Medicine and Distinguished Professor of Medicine, Cellular and Molecular Medicine and Neurosciences at the University of California at San Diego, and Head, Laboratory for Cell Biology at the San Diego branch of Ludwig Cancer Research.

Biography 
Cleveland grew up in Las Cruces, New Mexico.  He earned a B.S. in physics in 1972 from New Mexico State University, and graduated as the valedictorian for the College of Arts and Sciences.

Cleveland started graduate school at Princeton University in 1972, switching mid-year into biochemistry. He worked with Marc Kirschner and graduated with a Ph.D. in 1977. Cleveland's doctoral dissertation was titled "Purification and properties of tau, a microtubule associated protein which induces assembly of microtubules from purified tubulin". As a graduate student, Cleveland provided the initial identification and characterization of tau, showing it to have characteristics of a natively unfolded protein. Tau is now recognized to accumulate in Alzheimer's disease and to be the basis for chronic brain injury. He also developed and published a peptide fingerprinting technique that was so popular that it became a citation classic  Cleveland did postdoctoral work with William J. Rutter at the University of California at San Francisco from 1978 to 1981. Cleveland was the first to clone tubulin actin and keratin

From 1981 through 1995, Cleveland was on the faculty of the Department of Biological Chemistry at the Johns Hopkins University School of Medicine. In 1995, he accepted a position at the San Diego Branch of Ludwig Cancer Research at the University of California at San Diego. Since 2008, he has been Chair of the Department of Cellular and Molecular Medicine.

Contributions to Science 
Cleveland has made pioneering discoveries of the mechanisms of chromosome movement and cell-cycle control during normal cellular division, as well as of the principles of neuronal cell development and their relationship to the defects that contribute to inherited neurodegenerative disease. Cleveland's research looks at the molecular genetics of axonal growth and motor neuron disease and the cell biology of mammalian chromosome movement.

Most recently, his research has achieved a significant breakthrough in treating Huntington's disease, an inherited and degenerative brain disorder for which there is no cure. A one-time injection of a new DNA-based drug treatment - known as ASO (short for antisense oligonucleotide) - blocked the activity of the gene whose mutation causes the disease. A single treatment silenced the mutated gene responsible for the disease, slowing and partially reversing progression of the fatal neurodegenerative disorder in animal models. This drug, called IONIS-HTTRx, was developed by scientists at Ionis Pharmaceuticals in collaboration with partners CHDI Foundation, Roche Pharmaceuticals and academic collaborators at University of California, San Diego and is now in a Phase 1/2a clinical study.

Books 
Cell and Molecular Biology of the Cytoskeleton: Molecular Mechanisms Controlling Tubulin Synthesis
Edited by Jerry W. Shay
(Plenum Press, 1986), 

With Toni L. Williamson, Mouse Models in the Study of Genetic Neurological Disorders: Mouse Models of Amyotrophic Lateral Sclerosis
Edited by Brian Popko 
(Kluwer Academic/Plenum Publishers, 1999), 

With Nicholas G. Theodorakis, Control of Messenger RNA Stability: Translationally Coupled Degradation of Tubulin mRNA Edited By Joel Belasco and George Brawerman
(Academic Press, Inc., 1993)

Select honors 
 Elected Member, National Academy of Sciences, 2006
 Elected Member, Institute of Medicine (IOM), 2012
 Elected Fellow, American Academy of Arts and Sciences, 2006
 Elected Fellow, American Academy of Microbiology, 2006
 Elected Fellow, American Association for the Advancement of Science (AAAS), 2009
 President, American Society for Cell Biology, 2013
 Sheila Essey Prize, American Academy of Neurology, April 1999
 Outstanding Scientist Award, Playing to Win for Life Foundation, September 2004
 Wings Over Wall Street and MDA Outstanding Scientist, October 2007
 2012 Research Award, The Huntington's Disease Society of America
 Katharine Berkan Judd Award, Memorial Sloan Kettering, 2012
 The Ricketts Award, University of Chicago, 2012
 The Gerson Distinguished Scholar Award, Univ. of Pittsburgh, 2014
 Essey Prize for ALS Research, The ALS Association, 2014
 UCSD Chancellor's Award for Excellence in Postdoctoral Scholar Mentoring, 2014
 Thomas Reuters' 2015 listing of "The World's Most Influential Scientific Minds" 2015
 Breakthrough Prize in Life Sciences, 2018 
 NOMIS Distinguished Scientist Awardee, 2018
ASCB E.B. Wilson Medal, 2022

References

External links 
 ASCB 2013 – Saturday, December 14th President's Introduction 
 UCSD and Ludwig Cancer Research Ice Bucket Challenge
 Clive Svendsen and Don W. Cleveland "Ask The Experts" 
 Lou Gehrig's Disease (ALS): UCSD Team's Stem Cell Therapy Rationale
 2014 "Commitment to a Cure" Essey Award Winners Newsreel
 2017 "Don Cleveland CSHL Leading Strand"
 2017 "Designer DNA Drugs with Don Cleveland - On Our Mind"
 2017 "Don Cleveland Wins Breakthrough Prize"
 2018 Don W. Cleveland, NOMIS Distinguished Scientist Awardee"

1950 births
People from Waynesville, Missouri
University of California, San Diego faculty
Princeton University alumni
University of California, San Francisco alumni
Johns Hopkins University faculty
New Mexico State University alumni
People from Las Cruces, New Mexico
Living people
Fellows of the American Academy of Microbiology
Members of the National Academy of Medicine